Statistics is the study of the collection, organization, analysis, and interpretation of data. It deals with all aspects of this, including the planning of data collection in terms of the design of surveys and experiments. This is a list of academic statistical associations.

International statistical societies
 Institute of Mathematical Statistics
 International Biometric Society
 International Society for Bayesian Analysis
 International Statistical Institute (ISI)
 Statisticians in the Pharmaceutical Industry (PSI)

National statistical societies
 American Statistical Association
 Indian Statistical Institute
  ( The INDIAN SOCIETY FOR MEDICAL STATISTICS (ISMS))   ( https://www.isms-ind.org/ )
 Italian society of economics demography and statistics (SIEDS)
 Royal Statistical Society (RSS of London)
 Statistical Society of Australia
 Statistical Society of Canada

Regional societies
 University Statisticians of the Southern Experiment Stations (USA)

Statistical honor societies
 Mu Sigma Rho (USA)

See also
 Official statistics
 Statistics
 List of statistical topics
 List of national and international statistical services
 List of mathematical societies

External links
 International Statistical Agencies (list by US Census Bureau)
 List of scholarly societies - Statistics

Lists of organizations
 
Statistics-related lists